Bromarv is a village and former municipality of Finland comprising the former municipalities Tenala together with the town of Ekenäs. It was merged with Pohja and Karis to form the new municipality of Raseborg on January 1, 2009.

Bromarv was located in the province of Southern Finland and was part of the Uusimaa region.

The town was bilingual, with the majority being Swedish speakers (91,7%).

It is noted for its archipelago, part of which is the Raseborgs västra skärgård.

Sub-region of Uusimaa
Bromarv was also the name of a sub-region of Uusimaa, also known as Nyland.

References

External links

Populated places disestablished in 2009
2009 disestablishments in Finland
Former municipalities of Finland
Raseborg